Mutasarrif or mutesarrif was the title used in the Ottoman Empire and places like post-Ottoman Iraq for the governor of an administrative district. The Ottoman rank of mutasarrif was established as part of a 1864 reform, and its holder was appointed directly by the Sultan. 

A mutasarrif was subordinate to a wali or governor-general of a province, while being of superior rank to a kaymakam.

Etymology
Ottoman Turkish mutasarrıf is derived from the Arabic mutaṣarrif, meaning provincial governor. Mutaṣarrif is the active participle of taṣarrafa, meaning "to act without restriction", "have the right of disposing (over somebody or something)".

History
This administrative unit was sometimes independent (e.g., Mount Lebanon Mutasarrifate or Cyprus) and sometimes was part of a vilayet (province), administered by a vali, and contained nahiye (communes), each administered by a kaymakam. This rank was established in 1864 against the new Law of Villayets instead of rank of mutesellim which was abolished in 1842.

"This small political unit was governed by a non-Lebanese Ottoman Christian subject and given the protection of European powers. The religious communities of the district were represented by a council that dealt directly with the governor. This system provided peace and prosperity until its abolition."

The mutassarifates of the Ottoman Empire included:
 Mutasarrifate of Mount Lebanon (formed 1861)
 Mutasarrifate of Jerusalem (formed 1872)
 Mutasarrifate of Karak (formed 1894/5)
 Mutasarrifate of Izmit

See also
 Mutesellim
 State organization of the Ottoman Empire
 Subdivisions of the Ottoman Empire

References

External links
 Turkish explanation of the term

Ottoman titles
Turkish words and phrases
Subdivisions of the Ottoman Empire